Third Ring Road may refer to:

 3rd Ring Road (Beijing)
 Third Ring Expressway (Isfahan)
 3rd Ring Road (Kunming)
 Third Ring Road (Moscow)
 R3 (ring road) of Charleroi, Belgium
 Ring 3 (Hamburg), Germany
 Ring 3 (Oslo), Norway

See also

 List of ring roads
 Ring 3 (disambiguation)
 Three-ring (disambiguation)